Bolbabria Cove (‘Zaliv Bolbabria’ \'za-liv bol-'ba-bri-ya\) is the 2 km wide cove indenting for 1.85 km the west coast of Liège Island in the Palmer Archipelago, Antarctica.  It is entered north of Disilitsa Point and south of the westerly offshoot of Beaumont Hill, and has its head fed by Zbelsurd Glacier.

The cove is named after the ancient Thracian settlement of Bolbabria in Western Bulgaria.

Location
British mapping in 1978.

Maps
 British Antarctic Territory.  Scale 1:200000 topographic map.  DOS 610 Series, Sheet W 64 62.  Directorate of Overseas Surveys, UK, 1980.
 Antarctic Digital Database (ADD). Scale 1:250000 topographic map of Antarctica. Scientific Committee on Antarctic Research (SCAR). Since 1993, regularly upgraded and updated.

References 
 Bulgarian Antarctic Gazetteer. Antarctic Place-names Commission. (details in Bulgarian, basic data in English)
 Bolbabria Cove on AADC website
 Bolbabria Cove. SCAR Composite Antarctic Gazetteer.

External links
 Bolbabria Cove. Copernix satellite image

Coves of Graham Land
Bulgaria and the Antarctic
Liège Island